Page is a neighborhood in the Nokomis community in Minneapolis. Its boundaries are the Minnehaha Creek to the north, Chicago Avenue to the east, Diamond Lake Road and East 55th Street to the south, and Interstate 35W to the west. Page shares a neighborhood organization with the Hale and Diamond Lake neighborhoods.

The neighborhood is named after the now demolished Page Elementary School, which was in turn named in honor of author and diplomat Walter Hines Page.

References

External links
Minneapolis Neighborhood Profile - Page
Hale-Page-Diamond Lake Community Association
West Page Neighborhood Network

Neighborhoods in Minneapolis